The siege of Giarabub (now Jaghbub) in Libya, was an engagement between Commonwealth and Italian forces, during the Western Desert Campaign of the Second World War.

Air transport proved insufficient and hunger prompted many of the locally recruited troops to desert. After being reinforced by the 2/9th Australian Battalion and a battery of the 4th Royal Horse Artillery, the Australians attacked Giarabub on 17 March 1941 and the Italian garrison surrendered on 21 March.

Background

Giarabub
The Great Sand Sea of the Sahara Desert lies to the south, and the town is at the west end of salt marshes which go up to the Egyptian border. Giarabub is the westernmost in a line of oases on the edge of the Sahara into Egypt. In 1940, it was the southernmost Italian frontier post along the border with Egypt. Giarabub had been garrisoned by the Italians since 1925, after being ceded to Libya from Egypt by the British. Gullies and re-entrants had been entrenched and barbed wire laid out around the village. Giarabub was at the end of a long supply line, made worse by a lack of vehicles. The Italian army lacked the mobility necessary to maintain outposts against opposition and could deliver only a small amount of supplies by air.

6th Australian Divisional Cavalry
The 6th ADCR should have had Vickers light tanks and Bren carriers but few were available and those that were proved mechanically unreliable in the desert. The Australians were outgunned and withdrew, after Italian infantry in trucks and three Italian fighter aircraft arrived. On 14 December, B Squadron ambushed and destroyed a convoy near Fort Maddalena. The Australians patrolled to reconnoitre and isolate Giarabub, ready for an attack. On 31 December, 6th ADCR suffered its first losses when a patrol was forced to retreat after coming under artillery fire, with two men killed and three vehicles destroyed.

Prelude

Siege

On 20 December, C Squadron conducted a secret reconnaissance of the outer defences of Giarabub. On 24 December, part of B Squadron attacked and captured an outpost at Ain Melfa, at the east end of the Giarabub salt marshes and used it as an advanced post. With the capture of the El Qaseibieya, well to the south-west fringe of the marshes, the Australians dominated the west end of the area. On 25 December, a reconnaissance in force by C Squadron was met with artillery-fire and air attacks. The following night, a raid on an Italian gun position was forced to withdraw after being detected; one man was captured. On 8 January 1941, a relief convoy was destroyed by the Royal Air Force (RAF) near Giarabub. This was the last Italian attempt to supply the oasis by land, after the defeat of the 10th Army in Operation Compass and its withdrawal from Cyrenaica.

The  (Royal Italian Air Force) made several attempts to supply the oasis by air but on 4 January, four 25-pounder field guns arrived at Siwa; on 9 January, the guns bombarded the Italian airstrip at Giarabub, damaging a transport aircraft and silencing two field guns. Airdrops of supplies were insufficient to feed the garrison. Libyan troops began to abandon their posts and by the end of February,  been captured; the regular troops held on. The 6th ADCR had observed and harassed the oasis defenders but did not have the strength to attack the position. An advanced landing ground was established by the RAF beyond Siwa but a lack of aircraft made it redundant. Small Italian supply drops continued but rations for the garrison were drastically reduced.

British offensive preparations
Brigadier-General George Wootten, commander of the 18th Australian Infantry Brigade in the 6th Australian Division, was ordered to Giarabub but a lack of transport restricted the operation to a reinforced battalion, which had to end the siege in ten days. Wootten Force was assembled from the 2/9th Australian Infantry Battalion, reinforced by an infantry company, a mortar platoon, a machine-gun platoon, an anti-aircraft platoon and a battery of the 4th Regiment, Royal Horse Artillery (4th RHA) with twelve 25-pounder field guns. Wootten Force had no air support, little ammunition and no tanks. The Australians reconnoitred the Giarabub defences on 12 and 16 March, finding a track across the southern marshes and a gap in the frontier wire large enough for vehicles. An Italian force in trucks tried to outflank the reconnaissance party and were driven off by artillery--fire.

The heights south of the town were judged to be crucial to the Italian defence and B Squadron was ordered to take the Italian observation post (later named Wootten House) and advance north-west along the track toward Giarabub. (An Italian officer volunteered information of the oasis defences.) The Australians were forced back by artillery fire and the post re-occupied, Breda cannons at the post being used to keep the Australians at a distance. On 19 March Wootten ordered an attack by two companies along the southern track to re-take Daly House and to drive the Italians back to the last line of the main Giarabub defences, to gain a good jumping-off position to attack the southern heights. Two 25-pounders were pulled through the marsh behind the infantry through heavy going to Daly House, which delayed the attackers until 

The post was unoccupied and artillery and machine-gun fire from the town was inaccurate. The Australians pressed on and occupied the Tamma Heights south-east of the oasis against little opposition; 13 Platoon was sent to Ship Hill at the east end of the heights, to provide covering fire, while the other two platoons advanced towards the town. By dark they had reached the south-eastern corner, where the wire had been covered by sand. Two sections advanced into the Italian position and found that Post 42 had been abandoned. On the arrival of 10 Platoon, the party occupied Post 36 and at  an Italian counter-attack was delivered and the Australians retired, suffering three wounded and having two men captured. By the morning of 20 March it had been decided to make the main attack in that area; supporting operations, a demonstration by the cavalry to the north and Post 76 on Brigadiers Hill had been taken by D Company, 2/10th Battalion, which secured the flank of the attack and left the Italians unsure of the direction of the main attack.

Plan of attack
Two companies of the 2/9th Battalion were to attack, covered by fire from the mortars and machine-guns on Ship Hill and the 4th RHA. The attack was to capture the southern redoubt and then the other two companies would attack along the flanks of the redoubt and D Company, 2/10th Australian Infantry Battalion, would advance from Brigadiers Hill to open a track across the marsh and shorten the supply route. The cavalry would mount a subsidiary attack from the northern approach down Pipsqueak Valley, to take the airfield. A sandstorm blew up and clogged weapons which needed to be cleaned, then in the afternoon the storm abated but was sufficient to obscure the Australian assembly. There were exchanges of fire and from Ship Hill, the Australian machine-gunners could hit the Italian defences around the oasis and suppressed several positions. An Italian sniper stalked the machine-gun posts to no effect.

Patrols went forward after dark to observe Italian positions and make sure the Italians were not trying to slip away. An Australian listening post was met by an Italian patrol which withdrew when challenged. The Australians found the Italians in the redoubt "very nervous", firing and hurling grenades at shadows and then withdrew for the start of the attack. Zero hour was set at  when A Company was to attack on the right and C Company on the left, towards four knolls on the edge of the redoubt. When captured, A Company was to take the fifth knoll further back. The twelve guns of the 4th RHA would fire on the initial objectives, then lift onto the second objective; the machine-guns and mortars on Ship Hill were to give covering fire once the infantry advanced.

Battle
Before zero hour, the lead companies assembled amidst another sandstorm. A Company advanced to within  of the wire and was then bombarded by the British gunners who had underestimated the swirling wind and dropped short. The bombardment cut the line from the forward observer and the battery, which delayed an adjustment of range (shells also dropped short onto Ship Hill, causing one casualty). Twelve men of A Company were killed and twenty wounded; the survivors re-organised and began to move forward. A Platoon had avoided the worst of the bombardment but lost contact with the rest of A Company and continued the attack. C Company found that the wire had been cut and advanced to the first objective. The Italians appeared too stunned from the bombardment to offer much resistance and the Australians quickly reached the first line of knolls.

The Australians used many hand-grenades clearing dugouts and soon ran out. Some of the Australians had apparently been ordered to take no prisoners and were reluctant to advance, when it became clear that few Italians intended not to fight on. The Australians were ordered to encourage the Italians to surrender and by  the 2/9th Battalion had occupied the first four knolls. Due to the short shooting on A Company, a platoon of D Company, the battalion reserve, was sent forward to assist in the assault. The Italian defenders rallied, a mountain gun on the last knoll and Italian positions around the fort and plantation area opened fire and an attempt by an Australian platoon, to cross the flats into the town was repulsed. Fire of the mortars and machine-guns on Ship Hill and from a machine-gun detachment with A Company, covered the Australians as they captured the fifth knoll, just after 

Prisoners said that the garrison had not eaten for two days or nights. B Company on the left flank had advanced and re-gained contact with battalion HQ at  In the north, the cavalry diversion down Pipsqueak Valley to the airfield began at  an hour after the attack on the southern redoubt had commenced. B and C Squadrons advanced to occupy high ground on either side of the valley, with little Italian resistance except at the Egbert feature, which was bombarded and overrun. By  the cavalry were on the first objective, an east–west line through Egbert. D Company advanced through the cultivated area north-east of the redoubt into the town but a minefield, spotted earlier by an RAF Lysander crew, took a long time to clear. At  the 2/9th Battalion advanced into the town and found the mosque intact. By midday the Australians had entered the fort and ended the siege. After just two days the Australians withdrew from Giarabub, because of the Italo-German advance on El Agheila.

Aftermath

Analysis

On 17 March, Erwin Rommel had congratulated the garrison on its defence and promised that they would be relieved and on 24 March, Italo-German forces occupied El Agheila. The resistance of the Italian troops was greatly celebrated by the Fascist regime to mitigate the calamity in Cyrenaica. The Italian and Commonwealth forces had fought for three months on the edge of the Sahara, enduring large temperature variations, sandstorms, the defenders suffering a shortage of water and food. Differences in technical quality, leadership, training and supply had put the Italians at a permanent disadvantage to the besiegers. The Australians left behind a salvage party and withdrew from the oasis the next day, just before Operation Sonnenblume  an Italo-German counter-offensive, which recaptured Cyrenaica. A few weeks later, the 18th Australian Brigade Group began its part in the long Siege of Tobruk; the 6th ADCR went east and took part in Operation Exporter  the British invasion of Syria and Lebanon. Giarabub lost its tactical importance and became a backwater, eventually being used as a staging post for the Desert Air Force.

Casualties

See also

 Film: Giarabub (1942)
 List of Australian military equipment of World War II
List of British military equipment of World War II
 List of Italian military equipment in World War II

Notes

Footnotes

References

Further reading

External links
 Giarabub (film 1942) dir: Goffredo Alessandrini

Conflicts in 1941
1941 in Libya
Western Desert campaign
Libya in World War II
Battles of World War II involving Australia
Battles of World War II involving Italy
Giarabub
Sieges involving Australia
Sieges involving Italy
Sieges involving the United Kingdom
Sieges of World War II